{{Speciesbox
| image = 
| genus = Hydnum
| species = crocidens
| authority =  Cooke
| synonyms = 'Hydnum ambustum Cooke
}}Hydnum crocidens is a species of fungus in the family Hydnaceae native to Australia. It was described in 1890 by Mordecai Cubitt Cooke from material collected around Port Phillip Bay. Genetic analysis shows it to be closely related to a lineage containing H. rufescens'' and its close relatives.

References 

Fungi described in 1890
Fungi native to Australia
crocidens
Taxa named by Mordecai Cubitt Cooke